Alpha Mohamed Bangura (born February 4, 1980) is a Libyan-Sierra Leonean former professional basketball player who competed as a member of the Libya national basketball team at the FIBA Africa Championship 2009.

Amateur career
Bangura is a graduate of Eleanor Roosevelt High School in Greenbelt, Maryland, where he was teammates with fellow professional basketball players Delonte Holland and Eddie Basden.

Alpha Bangura played NCAA basketball at St. John's University for two years after starting his career at Monmouth University, where he averaged 18.9 points per game as a freshman and earned newcomer of the year. Bangura moved to St. John's after one season at Monmouth to play for coach Mike Jarvis. In 2002, he left  the team for unknown reasons.

Professional
Following his college career, Bangura played professional basketball in the United States with the CBA and USBL and overseas in Portugal, Israel, Spain, Japan, Puerto Rico, Lebanon, Kuwait, Venezuela, and in the Philippines for the Air21 Express. In 2008–09, Bangura spent most of the year with the Rio Grande Valley Vipers of the D-League, averaging 18.9 points per game over 26 games before being traded to the Bakersfield Jam for the last nine games of the season. In 2010, he signed with Sporting Al Riyadi Beirut playing his first match in the league against runners-up Al Mouttahed Tripoli. He signed for Anibal Zahle in the Lebanese Basketball League for the 2010–11 season. He played his first game against his former team Sagesse.

He was signed by the Air21 Express as their second import for the 2011 PBA Commissioner's Cup. He led the team to the semi-finals while averaging 28 points per game after beating the Alaska Aces, 2–1.

Bangura was signed to the Washington Wizards in 2004.  He has also had stints with the Golden State Warriors, Los Angeles Clippers and Orlando Magic.

International
Bangura was the most consistent member of the Libyan team that finished 11th as the host country in the 2009 FIBA Africa Championship. He averaged 24.4 points per game over six games for the Libyans before his team failed to qualify to the next round. Bangura scored a game-high 25 points and grabbed seven rebounds in the opening game against South Africa to send the Libyans into the eighth finals. Bangura again scored a game-high 23 points in a two-point Libyan victory over Egypt in the eighth finals, its only victory in that round.

References 

1980 births
Living people
Atléticos de San Germán players
Bakersfield Jam players
CBA All-Star Game players
Expatriate basketball people in Spain
Libyan men's basketball players
Monmouth Hawks men's basketball players
Philippine Basketball Association imports
S.L. Benfica basketball players
Sierra Leonean men's basketball players
Small forwards
St. John's Red Storm men's basketball players
Barako Bull Energy players
Sportspeople from Maryland
Libyan expatriates in Spain
Sierra Leonean expatriates in Spain
Tenerife CB players
Libyan expatriate basketball people in the Philippines